Dr. Zaza Tsotniashvili (Georgian: ზაზა ცოტნიაშვილი; born July 26, 1971) is the rector of Gori University in Gori, Georgia.

Background

Dr. Zaza Tsotniashvili was educated in Georgia at Tbilisi State University and Tskhinvali State Pedagogical Institute.  He also attended programs of study in:
 Political Science at Aikhshtadt University in Germany
 Management and Administration at the ESM Business School in Georgia
 The Open World Leadership Program in the US.

He has participated in courses and conferences on
 The International Scientific Conference, War and Peace Journalism (Georgia)
 Learning in Later Life (Cyprus)
 Academician of Academy of Educational Sciences of Georgia (Georgia)
 Modern Teaching, Learning and Assessment Methodology (USA)
 Russian influence on Caucasus (Poland)
 Project Cycle Management (Cordaid Netherlands, Georgia)

and many other international activities.

In 2005 he defended his Doctor’s dissertation: "Georgian-Ossetian Relations in the Press in the 19th-20th centuries".

Prior to his permanent assignment as rector of Gori University, Tsotniashvili was an acting rector of Tskhinvali and Gori Universities, and at different times dean of Humanitarian, Social Sciences and Philology-Journalism faculties. In addition, he worked in leadership positions on various community organizations.

In addition, Dr. Tsotniashvili is an expert of Fondazione Romualdo Del Bianco and President of Shida Kartli Tennis Federation. He is actively involved in community development and charity activities.

Publications
Tsotniashvili is an author of 3 books and 35 scientific articles.

References

External links
  Zaza Tsotniashvili — Biographical Dictionary of Georgia

1971 births
Living people
Tbilisi State University alumni
Rectors of universities in Georgia (country)
Academic staff of Gori State Teaching University